Longtan Lake or Longtan Tourist Pond is a lake in Shanglin Village, Longtan District, Taoyuan City, Taiwan. The lake is known for the Buddhist temple in the centre of the lake.

History
The lake was originally built for irrigation. After the construction of a temple nearby and the suspension bridge, the lake turned into a major tourist attraction in 1971.

Geology
The lake spans over an area of 18 hectares. It consists of a bicycle trail, kiddy pool, children playground, lookout point, walking trail, memorial hall, water plant area, outdoor fitness facility and several pavilions.

Activities
The lake is the venue for the annual dragon boat race.

See also
 Geography of Taiwan

References

Landforms of Taoyuan City
Lakes of Taiwan
Tourist attractions in Taoyuan City